EuroLeague Awards were established in the 1987–88 season, when the EuroLeague's modern era and the EuroLeague Final Four first began. More awards were created starting with the 2000–01 basketball season, when Euroleague Basketball Company essentially took over the management of the premier level European competition from FIBA Europe.

EuroLeague awards

EuroLeague Full Season MVP

The EuroLeague Full Season MVP award began in the 2004–05 season. It replaced both the EuroLeague Regular Season MVP and EuroLeague Top 16 MVP awards. The EuroLeague Full Season MVP award combined the regular season and Top 16 awards together into a new award that is for the entire EuroLeague season, the regular season, Top 16, and playoffs, up until the EuroLeague Final Four. The award is based on a voting process, rather than on the PIR stat, like the EuroLeague Regular Season MVP and EuroLeague Top 16 MVP awards were. The award is analogous to the NBA Most Valuable Player Award.

EuroLeague Final Four MVP

The Turkish Airlines EuroLeague Final Four MVP award is the MVP award for the final two games of the EuroLeague season. The award began in the 1987–88 season, when the EuroLeague Final Four modern era began. It is the originating MVP award, intended as the "most valuable player" on the best team award and is generally considered the most prestigious and important individual award given in European club basketball. The award is based on a voting process involving members of the press.

Toni Kukoč of Jugoplastika, Pop 84 and Benetton Treviso won the award three times, two of them consecutively. Vassilis Spanoulis of Panathinaikos and Olympiacos has also won the award three times, two of them consecutively. Dejan Bodiroga also won the award two consecutive times, with two different teams (Panathinaikos and FC Barcelona).

There were two major European club basketball competitions in the 2000–01 season, the 2000–01 Euroleague, and the FIBA SuproLeague 2000–01. After the 2000–01 season ended, the EuroLeague took over the FIBA SuproLeague and absorbed it. As part of the agreement, the championship and MVPs won in the SuproLeague were to be kept as records by the EuroLeague. Ariel McDonald won the Final Four MVP of that season's FIBA SuproLeague, however, he did not play in the EuroLeague competition at all that season.

EuroLeague Regular Season and Top 16 MVP

EuroLeague Regular Season MVP
The EuroLeague Regular Season MVP award was the MVP award for the regular season stage of the season. The award was based on the PIR stat, instead of a voting process. It began in the 2000–01 season and it was discontinued after the 2003–04 season. It was phased out as an award, when the EuroLeague created the EuroLeague MVP of the Month and EuroLeague Full Season awards in place of it, beginning in the 2004–05 season.

FIBA SuproLeague Season MVP
There were two major European club basketball competitions in the 2000–01 season, the 2000–01 Euroleague, and the FIBA SuproLeague 2000–01. After the 2000–01 season ended, the EuroLeague took over the FIBA SuproLeague and absorbed it. As part of the agreement, the championship and MVPs won in the SuproLeague were to be kept as records by the EuroLeague. Nate Huffman won the MVP of that season's FIBA SuproLeague, however, he did not play in the EuroLeague competition at all that season.

EuroLeague Top 16 MVP
The EuroLeague Top 16 MVP award was the MVP award for the Top 16 stage of the season. The award was based on the PIR stat, instead of a voting process. It began in the 2001–02 season, and it was discontinued after the 2003–04 season. It was phased out as an award, when the EuroLeague created the EuroLeague MVP of the Month and EuroLeague Full Season awards in place of it, beginning in the 2004–05 season.

EuroLeague MVP of the Month

The EuroLeague MVP of the Month award is the award for the league's best player for each month of the season. The award began in the 2004–05 season.

EuroLeague MVP of the Round

The EuroLeague MVP of the Round award is the award for the league's best player for each round of the season. The award is given to the player that has the highest PIR stat among all players from winning teams for that round's EuroLeague games. The award is given based on a one-game performance. The award began in the 2000–01 season.

EuroLeague Finals Top Scorer

Alphonso Ford Trophy

The EuroLeague Alphonso Ford Trophy is the award given to the leading scorer of the EuroLeague, up until the EuroLeague Final Four. It is named in honor of Alphonso Ford. The award began with the 2004–05 season.

EuroLeague Best Defender

The EuroLeague Best Defender award is the award for the league's best defensive player throughout the season up until the EuroLeague Final Four. The award began in the 2004–05 season, and is based on a voting process involving EuroLeague head coaches. Dimitris Diamantidis of Panathinaikos, won the award five consecutive times, from 2005 to 2009.

EuroLeague Rising Star

The EuroLeague Rising Star award is the award for the league's "future rising star". Only players that were younger than age 22, after July 1, of the summer before the season started are eligible for the award. It was established in the 2004–05 season, and is based on a voting process involving all EuroLeague head coaches.

EuroLeague Magic Moment

The EuroLeague Magic Moment is the award for the league's "most spectacular play of the season". It was established in the 2016–17 season, and is selected through an online vote of the fans.

Alexander Gomelsky EuroLeague Coach of the Year

The Alexander Gomelsky EuroLeague Coach of the Year award is given to the best head coach of the season, who wins the Alexander Gomelsky Trophy, in recognition of his achievements, after the end of the full EuroLeague season. The award was established in the 2004–05 season, and is based on a voting process involving all EuroLeague head coaches.

Gianluigi Porelli EuroLeague Executive of the Year

The best CEO of the EuroLeague season wins the Gianluigi Porelli EuroLeague Executive of the Year award. The award was established starting with the 2004–05 season.

EuroLeague Basketball Legends

EuroLeague Basketball Legends are a very distinct and small group of the very biggest EuroLeague stars, which are honored in recognition of their outstanding playing careers in the league.

50 Greatest EuroLeague Contributors

The 50 Greatest Contributors in EuroLeague history list, was chosen on February 3, 2008, by a panel of European basketball experts. It consisted of 35 players, 10 coaches, and 5 referees, and included other nominees for each category; all together 105 players, 20 coaches, and 12 referees were nominated.

EuroLeague Basketball 2000–10 All-Decade Team

The EuroLeague Basketball 2000–10 All-Decade Team consisted of basketball players named to the EuroLeague's All-Decade Team, for the first 10 years of the Euroleague Basketball Company's competition, from 2000–10.

There were 50 players nominated for the All-Decade Team. Voting included votes from selected media members and fans.

EuroLeague Basketball 2010–20 All-Decade Team

All-EuroLeague Team

Every season, five players are chosen, regardless of their positions, for each of the two All-EuroLeague teams (the first and second teams). The voting process involves both fans and a panel of journalists and experts. Online fan voting accounts for 25% of the vote total, while media voting for the remaining 75%.

EuroLeague All-Final Four Team

The EuroLeague All-Final Four Team, or FIBA SuproLeague All-Final Four Team, was an award given for the EuroLeague's top five basketball players, of each season's EuroLeague Final Four competition. The EuroLeague Final Four MVP, was selected from among the five players of the EuroLeague Final Four Team. The award existed during the era in which the EuroLeague was organized by FIBA Europe. It was bestowed for the last time by the FIBA SuproLeague, during the 2000–01 season's FIBA SuproLeague Final Four.

See also
EuroCup Basketball Awards (top-tier level)
Basketball Champions League Awards (third-tier level)

Notes
 There were two officially recognized first tier European club basketball competitions during the 2000–01 season. The FIBA SuproLeague 2000–01, and Euroleague Basketball 2000–01. McDonald was the MVP of the 2001 FIBA SuproLeague Final Four.
 There were two officially recognized first tier European club basketball competitions during the 2000–01 season. The FIBA SuproLeague 2000–01, and Euroleague Basketball 2000–01. Ginóbili was the MVP of the 2001 Euroleague Finals.
 There were two officially recognized first tier European club basketball competitions during the 2000–01 season. The FIBA SuproLeague 2000–01, and Euroleague Basketball 2000–01. Huffman was the MVP of the FIBA SuproLeague competition that season.
 There were two officially recognized first tier European club basketball competitions during the 2000–01 season. The FIBA SuproLeague 2000–01, and Euroleague Basketball 2000–01. Tomašević was the MVP of the EuroLeague Basketball competition that season.

References

External links
 EuroLeague Official Web Page
 InterBasket EuroLeague Basketball Forum
 TalkBasket EuroLeague Basketball Forum